Dowzariv (also Romanized as Dowzarīv; also known as Bādāmestān-e Pā’īn and Dowzarū’īyeh) is a village in Madvarat Rural District, in the Central District of Shahr-e Babak County, Kerman Province, Iran. At the 2006 census, its population was 17, in 7 families.

References 

Populated places in Shahr-e Babak County